is Miho Komatsu 13th single  released under Giza Studio label. It was released 30 May 2001. The single reached #22 for its first week and sold 12,780 copies. It charted for 2 weeks and, in total, sold 16,110 copies.

Track listing
All songs are written and composed by Miho Komatsu and arranged by Yoshinobu Ohga

glass
NAKED
 (instrumental)

References 

2001 singles
Miho Komatsu songs
Songs written by Miho Komatsu
2001 songs
Giza Studio singles
Being Inc. singles
Song recordings produced by Daiko Nagato